Bixad is a commune of 6,340 inhabitants situated in Satu Mare County, Romania. It is composed of three villages: Bixad, Boinești (Bujánháza) and Trip (Terep).

References

Communes in Satu Mare County